State Route 14, located in northeastern Ohio, runs from U.S. Route 6/U.S. Route 42/State Route 3 in Downtown Cleveland southeasterly to the Pennsylvania state line near East Palestine; Pennsylvania Route 51 continues southeasterly from there.

History
 1924 – Original route established; original alignment was along its current alignment from Bedford to Unity, SR 170’s current alignment from Unity to East Palestine, and SR 165’s current alignment from East Palestine to the Pennsylvania state line.
 1931 – Extended to Cleveland via the former alignment of SR 8.
 1946 – Eastern terminus moved to current location via the former alignment of SR 165.
 1951 – Aligned with US 224 from Deerfield to Canfield and with SR 46 from Canfield to Columbiana; Deerfield-Columbiana alignment changed to SR 14A (Alternate).
 1957 – Routed around Ravenna via bypass route.
 1966 – Freeway alignment from Bedford to current I-80 in Streetsboro was established and was dually signed with I-80.
 1969 – Canfield bypass (current SR 446) added.
 1971 – Bedford-Streetsboro freeway alignment designation changed to I-480/SR 14 (I-80 designation dropped).
 1984 – Deerfield-Columbiana reverted to SR 14 designation; SR 14A designation dropped; Canfield bypass signed SR 446.

Major intersections

Route 14 Temporary

State Route 14 Temporary (SR 14T) is a 2.73-mile-long bypass around the city of Salem. SR 14T, a four-lane highway, begins at SR 14, Cleveland – East Liverpool Road, in Mahoning County. SR 14T crosses into Columbiana County and passes under County Route 61 and Goshen Road. SR 14T then has a diamond interchange with US 62 and SR 45. Exit ramps provide access from SR 14T to US 62 west and SR 45 south, and the two highways merge onto the SR 14T right-of-way as it continues past its terminus.

Although the SR 14T designation is unsigned, signs on the road read "TO US 62 / SR 45".

Major intersections

Route 14 Alternate

State Route 14A existed from 1951 to 1984 and followed what has been State Route 14 outside of that period between US 224 and SR 46 (see History section).

References

014
Transportation in Cuyahoga County, Ohio
Transportation in Summit County, Ohio
Transportation in Portage County, Ohio
Transportation in Mahoning County, Ohio
Transportation in Columbiana County, Ohio